Kulkacherla is a village & mandal headquarters in Vikarabad district of the Indian state of Telangana. Most of the population here is dependent on agriculture.

Administration 
Prior to re-organisation of districts in Telangana, Kulkacherla mandal was a part of Rangareddy district. It falls under the Pargi Assembly constituency and the Chevella Lok Sabha constituency. TRS, INC and BJP are the major political parties here.

Places of interest 
Pambanda Ramalingeswara temple, which is 2 km away from Kulkacherla, is a holy place for Hindus.

Transportation 
It is well connected to the state capital Hyderabad (90 kilometers) and other nearby towns (Mahbubnagar, Shadnagar, Vikarabad, Tandur , Pargi , Chevella , Shamshabad, Kosgi and Kodangal) by road. Nearest railway stations are Mahbubnagar (38 km), Vikarabad (40 km), Shadnagar (42 km) and Tandur (50 km). It is 80 km far from the Rajiv Gandhi International Airport, Shamshabad.

References 

Villages in Vikarabad district
Mandal headquarters in Vikarabad district